I Just Can't Help Myself is a studio album from American musician Terry Callier. Released by Cadet Records in 1973, this is the artist's fourth album since his debut a decade prior and the final of three that he recorded in short succession for Cadet with producer Charles Stepney. It has received positive critical reception.

Critical reception
The editorial staff of AllMusic Guide gave the release five out of five stars, with Jason Ankeny writing that the album is Callier's "most soulful and supple" for Cadet, comparing it to Marvin Gaye's classic run at Motown Records.

Track listing
All songs written by Terry Callier, except where noted.
"(I Just Can't Help Myself) I Don't Want Nobody Else" (Callier, Larry Wade)– 3:15
"Brown-Eyed-Lady" (Callier, Wade)– 3:18
"Gotta Get Closer to You" (Callier, Wade)– 3:22
"Satin Doll" (Duke Ellington, Johnny Mercer, Billy Strayhorn)– 4:16
"Until Tomorrow"– 5:39
"Alley-Wind Song"– 9:04
"Can't Catch the Trane"– 3:52
"Bowlin' Green" (Callier, Holmes Daylie)– 8:00

Personnel
Terry Callier– guitar, vocals, production
Arthur W. Ahlman– viola
Roger Anfinsen– engineering
Jerry Sabransky– violin
Errol Batts– backing vocals
Sol Bobrov– violin
Fred Breitberg– remixing
Leonard Chausow– cello
Malcolm Chisholm– remixing
Bobby Christian– percussion
Edward Druzinsky– harp
Cleveland Eaton– bass guitar
Richard Evans– bass guitar, arrangement on "Satin Doll", "Alley-Wind Song", and "Bowlin' Green"
William Faldner– violin
Karl Fruh– cello
Joseph Golan– violin
Elliott Golub– violin
Ruth Goodman– violin
Bruce Hayden– viola
John Howell– trumpet
Arthur Hoyle– trumpet
Morris Jennings– drums
Irving Kaplan– violin
Harold D. Klatz– viola
Phylis Knox– backing vocals
Harold Kupper– viola
Ethel Merker– French horn
Roger Moulton– viola
Don Myrick– alto saxophone
Alfred Nalls– percussion
Louis Satterfield– bass guitar
Bob Schiff– arrangement on "(I Just Can't Help Myself) I Don't Want Nobody Else" and "Gotta Get Closer to You"
Donald Simmons– drums
Theodore Silavin– violin
Gary Starr– engineering
Charles Stepney– electric piano, piano, production, arrangement on "Brown-Eyed-Lady", "Until Tomorrow", and "Can't Catch the Trane"
Neil Terk– design, photography
Paul Tervelt– French horn
Phil Upchurch– guitar
Larry Wade– backing vocals, production
Fred Walker– percussion
Everett Zlatoff-Mirsky– violin

References

External links

Entry at Rate Your Music

1974 albums
Albums produced by Charles Stepney
Cadet Records albums
Terry Callier albums